The San Diego Film Critics Society Award for Best Film (or Picture) is an award given by the San Diego Film Critics Society to honor the best film of the year.

Winners

1990s

2000s

2010s

2020s

References
San Diego Film Critics Society – Awards

Awards for best film
Lists of films by award